Bryndís Rún Hansen (born 9 May 1993) is an Icelandic swimmer. She competed in the women's 100 metre butterfly event at the 2017 World Aquatics Championships.

References

External links
 

1993 births
Living people
Icelandic female butterfly swimmers
Place of birth missing (living people)
Swimmers at the 2010 Summer Youth Olympics
21st-century Icelandic women